Shevchenkove is a village in Izmail Raion of Odesa Oblast of Ukraine. It belongs to Kiliia urban hromada, one of the hromadas of Ukraine.  According to the 2001 census, has a population of 5,625 inhabitants.

Until 18 July 2020, Shevchenkove belonged to Kiliia Raion. The raion was abolished in July 2020 as part of the administrative reform of Ukraine, which reduced the number of raions of Odesa Oblast to seven. The area of Kiliia Raion was merged into Izmail Raion.

References

Notes

Sources
Embassy of Ukraine to the State of Israel
Ukraine Industrial

Villages in Izmail Raion